The Constant Riley W. Bixby House is a historic house located at 2888 Carmen Road in Hartland, Niagara County, New York.

Description and history 
It is a two-story, cobblestone structure built in 1845 by Vermont native Constant Riley W. Bixby, in the Greek Revival/Exotic Revival style. It features smooth, regularly shaped, evenly colored lake-washed cobblestones in its construction. It is one of approximately 47 cobblestone structures in Niagara County. In total, there are three contributing structures and one non-contributing structure on the property.

It was listed on the National Register of Historic Places on November 15, 2002.

References

Houses on the National Register of Historic Places in New York (state)
Greek Revival houses in New York (state)
Cobblestone architecture
Houses in Niagara County, New York
1843 establishments in New York (state)
National Register of Historic Places in Niagara County, New York
Houses completed in 1845